Paulo Alexandre Marques Ferreira (born 14 September 1973) is a former Portuguese football player.

He played 10 seasons and 181 games in the Primeira Liga for Estrela da Amadora, Farense and Varzim.

Club career
He made his Primeira Liga debut for Estrela da Amadora on 22 August 1993 in a game against Vitória Setúbal.

References

External links
 
 

1973 births
Footballers from Lisbon
Living people
Portuguese footballers
Portugal youth international footballers
Portugal under-21 international footballers
C.F. Estrela da Amadora players
Liga Portugal 2 players
Primeira Liga players
FC Porto B players
S.C. Farense players
Varzim S.C. players
Association football forwards